Computational creativity (also known as artificial creativity, mechanical creativity, creative computing or creative computation) is a multidisciplinary endeavour that is located at the intersection of the fields of artificial intelligence, cognitive psychology, philosophy, and the arts (e.g., computational art as part of computational culture).

The goal of computational creativity is to model, simulate or replicate creativity using a computer, to achieve one of several ends:

 To construct a program or computer capable of human-level creativity.
 To better understand human creativity and to formulate an algorithmic perspective on creative behavior in humans.
 To design programs that can enhance human creativity without necessarily being creative themselves.

The field of computational creativity concerns itself with theoretical and practical issues in the study of creativity. Theoretical work on the nature and proper definition of creativity is performed in parallel with practical work on the implementation of systems that exhibit creativity, with one strand of work informing the other.

The applied form of computational creativity is known as media synthesis.

Theoretical issues
Theoretical approaches concern the essence of creativity. Especially, under what circumstances it is possible to call the model a "creative" if eminent creativity is about rule-breaking or the disavowal of convention. This is a variant of Ada Lovelace's objection to machine intelligence, as recapitulated by modern theorists such as Teresa Amabile. If a machine can do only what it was programmed to do, how can its behavior ever be called creative?

Indeed, not all computer theorists would agree with the premise that computers can only do what they are programmed to do—a key point in favor of computational creativity.

Defining creativity in computational terms
Because no single perspective or definition seems to offer a complete picture of creativity, the AI researchers Newell, Shaw and Simon developed the combination of novelty and usefulness into the cornerstone of a multi-pronged view of creativity, one that uses the following four criteria to categorize a given answer or solution as creative:
 The answer is novel and useful (either for the individual or for society)
 The answer demands that we reject ideas we had previously accepted
 The answer results from intense motivation and persistence
 The answer comes from clarifying a problem that was originally vague

Whereas the above reflects a top-down approach to computational creativity, an alternative thread has developed among bottom-up computational psychologists involved in artificial neural network research. During the late 1980s and early 1990s, for example, such generative neural systems were driven by genetic algorithms. Experiments involving recurrent nets were successful in hybridizing simple musical melodies and predicting listener expectations.

Machine learning for computational creativity 

While traditional computational approaches to creativity rely on the explicit formulation of prescriptions by developers and a certain degree of randomness in computer programs, machine learning methods allow computer programs to learn on heuristics from input data enabling creative capacities within the computer programs. Especially, deep artificial neural networks allow to learn patterns from input data that allow for the non-linear generation of creative artefacts. Before 1989, artificial neural networks have been used to model certain aspects of creativity. Peter Todd (1989) first trained a neural network to reproduce musical melodies from a training set of musical pieces. Then he used a change algorithm to modify the network's input parameters.  The network was able to randomly generate new music in a highly uncontrolled manner.  In 1992, Todd extended this work, using the so-called distal teacher approach that had been developed by Paul Munro, Paul Werbos,  D. Nguyen and Bernard Widrow,   Michael I. Jordan and David Rumelhart. In the new approach there are two neural networks, one of which is supplying training patterns to another. 
In later efforts by Todd, a composer would select a set of melodies that define the melody space, position them on a 2-d plane with a mouse-based graphic interface, and train a connectionist network to produce those melodies, and listen to the new "interpolated" melodies that the network generates corresponding to intermediate points in the 2-d plane.

Key concepts from the literature
Some high-level and philosophical themes recur throughout the field of computational creativity.

Important categories of creativity
Margaret Boden  refers to creativity that is novel merely to the agent that produces it as "P-creativity" (or "psychological creativity"), and refers to creativity that is recognized as novel by society at large as "H-creativity" (or "historical creativity"). Stephen Thaler has suggested a new category he calls "V-" or "Visceral creativity" wherein significance is invented through neural mapping to raw sensory inputs to a Creativity Machine architecture, with the "gateway" nets perturbed to produce alternative interpretations, and downstream nets shifting such interpretations to fit the overarching context. An important variety of such V-creativity is consciousness itself, wherein meaning is reflexively invented to activation turnover within the brain. Value driven creativity gives more freedom and autonomy to the AI system.

Exploratory and transformational creativity
Boden also distinguishes between the creativity that arises from an exploration within an established conceptual space, and the creativity that arises from a deliberate transformation or transcendence of this space. She labels the former as exploratory creativity and the latter as transformational creativity, seeing the latter as a form of creativity far more radical, challenging, and rarer than the former. Following the criteria from Newell and Simon elaborated above, we can see that both forms of creativity should produce results that are appreciably novel and useful (criterion 1), but exploratory creativity is more likely to arise from a thorough and persistent search of a well-understood space (criterion 3) -- while transformational creativity should involve the rejection of some of the constraints that define this space (criterion 2) or some of the assumptions that define the problem itself (criterion 4).  Boden's insights have guided work in computational creativity at a very general level, providing more an inspirational touchstone for development work than a technical framework of algorithmic substance. However, Boden's insights are also the subject of formalization, most notably in the work by Geraint Wiggins.

Generation and evaluation
The criterion that creative products should be novel and useful means that creative computational systems are typically structured into two phases, generation and evaluation. In the first phase, novel (to the system itself, thus P-Creative)  constructs are generated; unoriginal constructs that are already known to the system are filtered at this stage. This body of potentially creative constructs is then evaluated, to determine which are meaningful and useful and which are not. This two-phase structure conforms to the Geneplore model of Finke, Ward and Smith, which is a psychological model of creative generation based on empirical observation of human creativity.

Co-creation 
While much of computational creativity research focuses on independent and automatic machine-based creativity generation, many researchers are inclined towards a collaboration approach. This human-computer interaction is sometimes categorized under the creativity support tools development. These systems aim to provide an ideal framework for research, integration, decision making, and idea generation. Recently, deep learning approaches to imaging, sound and natural language processing, resulted in the modelling of productive creativity development frameworks.

Combinatorial creativity
A great deal, perhaps all, of human creativity can be understood as a novel combination of pre-existing ideas or objects. Common strategies for combinatorial creativity include:
Placing a familiar object in an unfamiliar setting (e.g., Marcel Duchamp's Fountain) or an unfamiliar object in a familiar setting (e.g., a fish-out-of-water story such as The Beverly Hillbillies)
Blending two superficially different objects or genres (e.g., a sci-fi story set in the Wild West, with robot cowboys, as in Westworld, or the reverse, as in Firefly; Japanese haiku poems, etc.)
Comparing a familiar object to a superficially unrelated and semantically distant concept (e.g., "Makeup is the Western burka"; "A zoo is a gallery with living exhibits")
Adding a new and unexpected feature to an existing concept (e.g., adding a scalpel to a Swiss Army knife; adding a camera to a mobile phone)
Compressing two incongruous scenarios into the same narrative to get a joke (e.g., the Emo Philips joke "Women are always using men to advance their careers. Damned anthropologists!")
Using an iconic image from one domain in a domain for an unrelated or incongruous idea or product (e.g., using the Marlboro Man image to sell cars, or to advertise the dangers of smoking-related impotence).
The combinatorial perspective allows us to model creativity as a search process through the space of possible combinations. The combinations can arise from composition or concatenation of different representations, or through a rule-based or stochastic transformation of initial and intermediate representations. Genetic algorithms and neural networks can be used to generate blended or crossover representations that capture a combination of different inputs.

Conceptual blending

Mark Turner and Gilles Fauconnier propose a model called Conceptual Integration Networks that elaborates upon Arthur Koestler's ideas about creativity as well as work by Lakoff and Johnson, by synthesizing ideas from Cognitive Linguistic research into mental spaces and conceptual metaphors. Their basic model defines an integration network as four connected spaces:

A first input space (contains one conceptual structure or mental space)
A second input space (to be blended with the first input)
A generic space of stock conventions and image-schemas that allow the input spaces to be understood from an integrated perspective
A blend space in which a selected projection of elements from both input spaces are combined; inferences arising from this combination also reside here, sometimes leading to emergent structures that conflict with the inputs.

Fauconnier and Turner describe a collection of optimality principles that are claimed to guide the construction of a well-formed integration network. In essence, they see blending as a compression mechanism in which two or more input structures are compressed into a single blend structure. This compression operates on the level of conceptual relations.  For example, a series of similarity relations between the input spaces can be compressed into a single identity relationship in the blend.

Some computational success has been achieved with the blending model by extending pre-existing computational models of analogical mapping that are compatible by virtue of their emphasis on connected semantic structures. In 2006, Francisco Câmara Pereira presented an implementation of blending theory that employs ideas both from GOFAI and genetic algorithms to realize some aspects of blending theory in a practical form; his example domains range from the linguistic to the visual, and the latter most notably includes the creation of mythical monsters by combining 3-D graphical models.

Linguistic creativity
Language provides continuous opportunity for creativity, evident in the generation of novel sentences, phrasings, puns, neologisms, rhymes, allusions, sarcasm, irony, similes, metaphors, analogies, witticisms, and jokes. Native speakers of morphologically rich languages frequently create new word-forms that are easily understood, and some have found their way to the dictionary. The area of natural language generation has been well studied, but these creative aspects of everyday language have yet to be incorporated with any robustness or scale.

Hypothesis of creative patterns
In the seminal work of applied linguist Ronald Carter, he hypothesized two main creativity types involving words and word patterns: pattern-reforming creativity, and pattern-forming creativity. Pattern-reforming creativity refers to creativity by the breaking of rules, reforming and reshaping patterns of language often through individual innovation, while pattern-forming creativity refers to creativity via conformity to language rules rather than breaking them, creating convergence, symmetry and greater mutuality between interlocutors through their interactions in the form of repetitions.

Story generation
Substantial work has been conducted in this area of linguistic creation since the 1970s, with the development of James Meehan's TALE-SPIN
 system. TALE-SPIN viewed stories as narrative descriptions of a problem-solving effort, and created stories by first establishing a goal for the story's characters so that their search for a solution could be tracked and recorded. The MINSTREL system represents a complex elaboration of this basic approach, distinguishing a range of character-level goals in the story from a range of author-level goals for the story. Systems like Bringsjord's BRUTUS elaborate these ideas further to create stories with complex inter-personal themes like betrayal. Nonetheless, MINSTREL explicitly models the creative process with a set of Transform Recall Adapt Methods (TRAMs) to create novel scenes from old. The MEXICA model of Rafael Pérez y Pérez and Mike Sharples is more explicitly interested in the creative process of storytelling, and implements a version of the engagement-reflection cognitive model of creative writing.

Metaphor and simile
Example of a metaphor: "She was an ape."

Example of a simile: "Felt like a tiger-fur blanket."
The computational study of these phenomena has mainly focused on interpretation as a knowledge-based process. Computationalists such as Yorick Wilks, James Martin, Dan Fass, John Barnden, and Mark Lee have developed knowledge-based approaches to the processing of metaphors, either at a linguistic level or a logical level. Tony Veale and Yanfen Hao have developed a system, called Sardonicus, that acquires a comprehensive database of explicit similes from the web; these similes are then tagged as bona-fide (e.g., "as hard as steel") or ironic (e.g., "as hairy as a bowling ball", "as pleasant as a root canal"); similes of either type can be retrieved on demand for any given adjective. They use these similes as the basis of an on-line metaphor generation system called Aristotle that can suggest lexical metaphors for a given descriptive goal (e.g., to describe a supermodel as skinny, the source terms "pencil", "whip", "whippet", "rope", "stick-insect" and "snake" are suggested).

Analogy
The process of analogical reasoning has been studied from both a mapping and a retrieval perspective, the latter being key to the generation of novel analogies. The dominant school of research, as advanced by Dedre Gentner, views analogy as a structure-preserving process; this view has been implemented in the structure mapping engine or SME, the MAC/FAC retrieval engine (Many Are Called, Few Are Chosen), ACME (Analogical Constraint Mapping Engine) and ARCS (Analogical Retrieval Constraint System). Other mapping-based approaches include Sapper, which situates the mapping process in a semantic-network model of memory. Analogy is a very active sub-area of creative computation and creative cognition; active figures in this sub-area include Douglas Hofstadter, Paul Thagard, and Keith Holyoak. Also worthy of note here is Peter Turney and Michael Littman's machine learning approach to the solving of SAT-style analogy problems; their approach achieves a score that compares well with average scores achieved by humans on these tests.

Joke generation

Humour is an especially knowledge-hungry process, and the most successful joke-generation systems to date have focussed on pun-generation, as exemplified by the work of Kim Binsted and Graeme Ritchie. This work includes the JAPE system, which can generate a wide range of puns that are consistently evaluated as novel and humorous by young children. An improved version of JAPE has been developed in the guise of the STANDUP system, which has been experimentally deployed as a means of enhancing linguistic interaction with children with communication disabilities. Some limited progress has been made in generating humour that involves other aspects of natural language, such as the deliberate misunderstanding of pronominal reference (in the work of Hans Wim Tinholt and Anton Nijholt), as well as in the generation of humorous acronyms in the HAHAcronym system of Oliviero Stock and Carlo Strapparava.

Neologism
The blending of multiple word forms is a dominant force for new word creation in language; these new words are commonly called "blends" or "portmanteau words" (after Lewis Carroll). Tony Veale has developed a system called ZeitGeist that harvests neological headwords from Wikipedia and interprets them relative to their local context in Wikipedia and relative to specific word senses in WordNet. ZeitGeist has been extended to generate neologisms of its own; the approach combines elements from an inventory of word parts that are harvested from WordNet, and simultaneously determines likely glosses for these new words (e.g., "food traveller" for "gastronaut" and "time traveller" for "chrononaut"). It then uses Web search to determine which glosses are meaningful and which neologisms have not been used before; this search identifies the subset of generated words that are both novel ("H-creative") and useful.

A corpus linguistic approach to the search and extraction of neologism have also shown to be possible. Using Corpus of Contemporary American English as a reference corpus, Locky Law has performed an extraction of neologism, portmanteaus and slang words using the hapax legomena which appeared in the scripts of American TV drama House M.D.

In terms of linguistic research in neologism, Stefan Th. Gries has performed a quantitative analysis of blend structure in English and found that "the degree of recognizability of the source words and that the similarity of source words to the blend plays a vital role in blend formation." The results were validated through a comparison of intentional blends to speech-error blends.

Poetry

Like jokes, poems involve a complex interaction of different constraints, and no general-purpose poem generator adequately combines the meaning, phrasing, structure and rhyme aspects of poetry. Nonetheless, Pablo Gervás has developed a noteworthy system called ASPERA that employs a case-based reasoning (CBR) approach to generating poetic formulations of a given input text via a composition of poetic fragments that are retrieved from a case-base of existing poems. Each poem fragment in the ASPERA case-base is annotated with a prose string that expresses the meaning of the fragment, and this prose string is used as the retrieval key for each fragment. Metrical rules are then used to combine these fragments into a well-formed poetic structure. Racter is an example of such a software project.

Musical creativity

Computational creativity in the music domain has focused both on the generation of musical scores for use by human musicians, and on the generation of music for performance by computers. The domain of generation has included classical music (with software that generates music in the style of Mozart and Bach) and jazz. Most notably, David Cope has written a software system called "Experiments in Musical Intelligence" (or "EMI")  that is capable of analyzing and generalizing from existing music by a human composer to generate novel musical compositions in the same style. EMI's output is convincing enough to persuade human listeners that its music is human-generated to a high level of competence.

In the field of contemporary classical music, Iamus is the first computer that composes from scratch, and produces final scores that professional interpreters can play. The London Symphony Orchestra played a piece for full orchestra, included in Iamus' debut CD, which New Scientist described as "The first major work composed by a computer and performed by a full orchestra". Melomics, the technology behind Iamus, is able to generate pieces in different styles of music with a similar level of quality.

Creativity research in jazz has focused on the process of improvisation and the cognitive demands that this places on a musical agent: reasoning about time, remembering and conceptualizing what has already been played, and planning ahead for what might be played next.
The robot Shimon, developed by Gil Weinberg of Georgia Tech, has demonstrated jazz improvisation. Virtual improvisation software based on researches on stylistic modeling carried out by Gerard Assayag and Shlomo Dubnov include OMax, SoMax and PyOracle, are used to create improvisations in real-time by re-injecting variable length sequences learned on the fly from live performer.

In 1994, a Creativity Machine architecture (see above) was able to generate 11,000 musical hooks by training a synaptically perturbed neural net on 100 melodies that had appeared on the top ten list over the last 30 years. In 1996, a self-bootstrapping Creativity Machine observed audience facial expressions through an advanced machine vision system and perfected its musical talents to generate an album entitled "Song of the Neurons"

In the field of musical composition, the patented works by René-Louis Baron allowed to make a robot that can create and play a multitude of orchestrated melodies, so-called "coherent" in any musical style. All outdoor physical parameter associated with one or more specific musical parameters, can influence and develop each of these songs (in real-time while listening to the song). The patented invention Medal-Composer raises problems of copyright.

Visual and artistic creativity
Computational creativity in the generation of visual art has had some notable successes in the creation of both abstract art and representational art. A well-known program in this domain is Harold Cohen's AARON, which has been continuously developed and augmented since 1973. Though formulaic, Aaron exhibits a range of outputs, generating black-and-white drawings or colour paintings that incorporate human figures (such as dancers), potted plants, rocks, and other elements of background imagery. These images are of a sufficiently high quality to be displayed in reputable galleries.

Other software artists of note include the NEvAr system (for "Neuro-Evolutionary Art") of Penousal Machado. NEvAr uses a genetic algorithm to derive a mathematical function that is then used to generate a coloured three-dimensional surface. A human user is allowed to select the best pictures after each phase of the genetic algorithm, and these preferences are used to guide successive phases, thereby pushing NEvAr's search into pockets of the search space that are considered most appealing to the user.

The Painting Fool, developed by Simon Colton originated as a system for overpainting digital images of a given scene in a choice of different painting styles, colour palettes and brush types. Given its dependence on an input source image to work with, the earliest iterations of the Painting Fool raised questions about the extent of, or lack of, creativity in a computational art system. Nonetheless, The Painting Fool has been extended to create novel images, much as AARON does, from its own limited imagination. Images in this vein include cityscapes and forests, which are generated by a process of constraint satisfaction from some basic scenarios provided by the user (e.g., these scenarios allow the system to infer that objects closer to the viewing plane should be larger and more color-saturated, while those further away should be less saturated and appear smaller). Artistically, the images now created by the Painting Fool appear on a par with those created by Aaron, though the extensible mechanisms employed by the former (constraint satisfaction, etc.) may well allow it to develop into a more elaborate and sophisticated painter.

The artist Krasi Dimtch (Krasimira Dimtchevska) and the software developer Svillen Ranev have created a computational system combining a rule-based generator of English sentences and a visual composition builder that converts sentences generated by the system into abstract art. The software generates automatically indefinite number of different images using different color, shape and size palettes. The software also allows the user to select the subject of the generated sentences or/and the one or more of the palettes used by the visual composition builder.

An emerging area of computational creativity is that of video games. ANGELINA is a system for creatively developing video games in Java by Michael Cook. One important aspect is Mechanic Miner, a system that can generate short segments of code that act as simple game mechanics. ANGELINA can evaluate these mechanics for usefulness by playing simple unsolvable game levels and testing to see if the new mechanic makes the level solvable. Sometimes Mechanic Miner discovers bugs in the code and exploits these to make new mechanics for the player to solve problems with.

In July 2015, Google released DeepDream – an open source computer vision program, created to detect faces and other patterns in images with the aim of automatically classifying images, which uses a convolutional neural network to find and enhance patterns in images via algorithmic pareidolia, thus creating a dreamlike psychedelic appearance in the deliberately over-processed images.

In August 2015, researchers from Tübingen, Germany created a convolutional neural network that uses neural representations to separate and recombine content and style of arbitrary images which is able to turn images into stylistic imitations of works of art by artists such as a Picasso or Van Gogh in about an hour. Their algorithm is put into use in the website DeepArt that allows users to create unique artistic images by their algorithm.

In early 2016, a global team of researchers explained how a new computational creativity approach known as the Digital Synaptic Neural Substrate (DSNS) could be used to generate original chess puzzles that were not derived from endgame databases. The DSNS is able to combine features of different objects (e.g. chess problems, paintings, music) using stochastic methods in order to derive new feature specifications which can be used to generate objects in any of the original domains. The generated chess puzzles have also been featured on YouTube.

Creativity in problem solving
Creativity is also useful in allowing for unusual solutions in problem solving. In psychology and cognitive science, this research area is called creative problem solving. The Explicit-Implicit Interaction (EII) theory of creativity has been implemented using a CLARION-based computational model that allows for the simulation of incubation and insight in problem solving. The emphasis of this computational creativity project is not on performance per se (as in artificial intelligence projects) but rather on the explanation of the psychological processes leading to human creativity and the reproduction of data collected in psychology experiments. So far, this project has been successful in providing an explanation for incubation effects in simple memory experiments, insight in problem solving, and reproducing the overshadowing effect in problem solving.

Debate about "general" theories of creativity
Some researchers feel that creativity is a complex phenomenon whose study is further complicated by the plasticity of the language we use to describe it. We can describe not just the agent of creativity as "creative" but also the product and the method. Consequently, it could be claimed that it is unrealistic to speak of a general theory of creativity. Nonetheless, some generative principles are more general than others, leading some advocates to claim that certain computational approaches are "general theories". Stephen Thaler, for instance, proposes that certain modalities of neural networks are generative enough, and general enough, to manifest a high degree of creative capabilities.

Criticism of computational creativity

Traditional computers, as mainly used in the computational creativity application, do not support creativity, as they fundamentally transform a set of discrete, limited domain of input parameters into a set of discrete, limited domain of output parameters using a limited set of computational functions.  As such, a computer cannot be creative, as everything in the output must have been already present in the input data or the algorithms. Related discussions and references to related work are captured in work on philosophical foundations of simulation.

Mathematically, the same set of arguments against creativity has been made by Chaitin. Similar observations come from a Model Theory perspective. All this criticism emphasizes that computational creativity is useful and may look like creativity, but it is not real creativity, as nothing new is created, just transformed in well defined algorithms.

Events
The International Conference on Computational Creativity (ICCC) occurs annually, organized by The Association for Computational Creativity. Events in the series include:
 ICCC 2019, Charlotte, North Carolina, USA
 ICCC 2018, Salamanca, Spain
 ICCC 2017, Atlanta, Georgia, USA
 ICCC 2016, Paris, France
 ICCC 2015, Park City, Utah, USA.  Keynote: Emily Short
 ICCC 2014, Ljubljana, Slovenia.  Keynote: Oliver Deussen
 ICCC 2013, Sydney, Australia.  Keynote: Arne Dietrich
 ICCC 2012, Dublin, Ireland.  Keynote: Steven Smith
 ICCC 2011, Mexico City, Mexico.  Keynote: George E Lewis
 ICCC 2010, Lisbon, Portugal.  Keynote/Invited Talks: Nancy J Nersessian and Mary Lou Maher

Previously, the community of computational creativity has held a dedicated workshop, the International Joint Workshop on Computational Creativity, every year since 1999.  Previous events in this series include:

IJWCC 2003, Acapulco, Mexico,  as part of IJCAI'2003
IJWCC 2004, Madrid, Spain, as part of ECCBR'2004
IJWCC 2005, Edinburgh, UK,  as part of IJCAI'2005
IJWCC 2006, Riva del Garda, Italy, as part of ECAI'2006
IJWCC 2007, London, UK, a stand-alone event
IJWCC 2008, Madrid, Spain, a stand-alone event

The 1st Conference on Computer Simulation of Musical Creativity will be held
 CCSMC 2016, 17–19 June, University of Huddersfield, UK.  Keynotes: Geraint Wiggins and Graeme Bailey.

Publications and forums
Design Computing and Cognition is one conference that addresses computational creativity. The ACM Creativity and Cognition conference is another forum for issues related to computational creativity. Journées d'Informatique Musicale 2016 keynote by Shlomo Dubnov was on Information Theoretic Creativity.

A number of books provide either a good introduction or a good overview of the field of computational creativity. These include:

Pereira, F. C. (2007). "Creativity and Artificial Intelligence: A Conceptual Blending Approach". Applications of Cognitive Linguistics series, Mouton de Gruyter.
Veale, T.  (2012).  "Exploding the Creativity Myth: The Computational Foundations of Linguistic Creativity". Bloomsbury Academic, London.
McCormack, J. and d'Inverno, M. (eds.) (2012). "Computers and Creativity". Springer, Berlin.
Veale, T., Feyaerts, K. and Forceville, C. (2013). "Creativity and the Agile Mind: A Multidisciplinary study of a Multifaceted phenomenon".  Mouton de Gruyter.
du Sautoy. M. (2019). "The Creativity Code". 4th Estate London. .

In addition to the proceedings of conferences and workshops, the computational creativity community has thus far produced these special journal issues dedicated to the topic:

New Generation Computing, volume 24, issue 3, 2006
Journal of Knowledge-Based Systems, volume 19, issue 7, November 2006
AI Magazine, volume 30, number 3, Fall 2009
Minds and Machines, volume 20, number 4, November 2010
Cognitive Computation, volume 4, issue 3, September 2012
AIEDAM, volume 27, number 4, Fall 2013
Computers in Entertainment, two special issues on Music Meta-Creation (MuMe), Fall 2016

Additionally, a new journal has started which focuses on computational creativity within the field of music:

JCMS 2016, Journal of Creative Music Systems

See also
1 the Road (1st novel)
Artificial imagination
Algorithmic art
Algorithmic composition
Applications of artificial intelligence
Computer art
Creative computing
Digital morphogenesis
Digital poetry
Generative systems
Intrinsic motivation (artificial intelligence)
Musikalisches Würfelspiel (Musical dice game)
Procedural generation

 Lists
 List of emerging technologies
 Outline of artificial intelligence

References

Further reading
 An Overview of Artificial Creativity  on Think Artificial
 Cohen, H., "the further exploits of AARON, Painter", SEHR, volume 4, issue 2: Constructions of the Mind, 1995
 Plotkin, R. "The Genie in the Machine"

External links

Documentaries
 Noorderlicht: Margaret Boden and Stephen Thaler on Creative Computers on Archive.org
 In Its Image on Archive.org

Cognitive psychology
Computational fields of study
Creativity techniques
Philosophy of artificial intelligence